A Canadian tax return refers to the obligatory forms that must be submitted to the Canada Revenue Agency (CRA) each financial year for individuals or corporations earning an income in Canada. The return paperwork reports the sum of the previous year's (January to December) taxable income, tax credits, and other information relating to those two items. The return is the method by which the Canadian government determines the appropriate amount of tax that should be paid by individuals and corporations. The result of filing a return with the federal government can result in either a refund (money owed to the person or corporation filing the return), or an amount due to be paid. There is a penalty for not filing a tax return. 

In generalised terms, a tax return refers to the yearly income declaration created by the taxpayer for every individual in the country. This enables tax authorities to declare if an individual is legible to be given back the tax that they had paid over the year.

Canadian federal tax returns are filed with the Canada Revenue Agency (CRA). Individuals and corporations who reside or conduct business in the province of Quebec also file separate returns with Revenu Québec.

In addition to tax purposes, the return plays a role in voter registration by including a checkbox asking if the signee if they are willing to have their personal contact information included on a national voter registry which is accessible by Elections Canada and its provincial equivalents.

Who should file a Canadian tax return
Canadians who live abroad can sometimes continue filing a Canadian tax return, even if they are not required to do so. Three primary factors are used to determine a taxpayer's tax residence: dwelling place (or places), spouse or common-law partner and dependants.

Due date
Normally, Canadian individual tax returns for any specific year must be filed by April 30 of the following year. There is no provision for generally extending this deadline, but there are a few exceptions.

Tax returns for self-employed individuals and their spouses must be filed by June 15 of the following year. However, any Goods and Services Tax/Harmonized Sales Tax owing for the period is due April 30.
Tax returns for deceased individuals must be filed by the normal filing deadline or 6 months after the date of death, whichever comes later. Example: Mary dies on January 30, 2004; her 2003 return is due on July 30, 2004 (six months later) and her 2004 return is due on April 30, 2005 (normal filing deadline). This provision is also extended to the surviving spouse.
Tax returns for non-residents electing to file under section 217 are due June 30 of the following year.
By virtue of the Interpretation Act the due date of all individual returns is moved to the next business day when the normal due date falls on a Sunday or Holiday. Although ministerial orders are also used to apply this to Saturday due dates, it is not a legal requirement.
The Federal Finance Minister may extend the deadline in cases of emergency situations such as floods, etc.

Provincial returns
Most provinces employ a system of federal-provincial agreements whereby the tax is collected on behalf of a province by the federal government. Quebec is the only province that collects provincial personal income taxes by their agency. Thus, Quebec residents file tax returns with both the Ministère du Revenu du Québec and the Canada Revenue Agency. Alberta, Ontario and Quebec all collect their own corporate income tax. Filing deadlines generally match those of the federal government.

Tax return software and online filing 
Tax returns can be prepared using various commercial software or online. The returns can be either printed and sent to CRA by mail or submitted to CRA electronically through a government service called NETFILE. Some tax preparation companies allow customers to file tax returns for free.

The biggest tax preparation companies in Canada are H&R Block and Intuit, the maker of TurboTax.

See also
 Canadian efile
 T1 General (form used for individual filing)
 Tax return (Australia)
 Tax return (United Kingdom)
 Tax return (United States)

References

External links
 http://www.cra-arc.gc.ca/gncy/t1gtrdy/menu-eng.html

Taxation in Canada
Tax forms